Alex Di Giorgio (born 28 July 1990 in Rome) is an Italian swimmer. He competed in the 4 × 200 metre freestyle relay event at the 2012 and 2016 Summer Olympics. He is openly gay.

References

External links
 

1990 births
Living people
Gay sportsmen
LGBT swimmers
Italian LGBT sportspeople
Swimmers from Rome
Italian male swimmers
Italian male freestyle swimmers
Olympic swimmers of Italy
Swimmers at the 2012 Summer Olympics
Swimmers at the 2016 Summer Olympics
Mediterranean Games medalists in swimming
Mediterranean Games gold medalists for Italy
Swimmers at the 2013 Mediterranean Games
Universiade medalists in swimming
Universiade silver medalists for Italy
Medalists at the 2017 Summer Universiade
21st-century LGBT people